Tazeen Qayyum is a Pakistani-Canadian conceptual artist working in a variety of media including miniature painting, drawing, sculpture, performance, and video. Her work explores issues of identity, immigration, socio-political conflict, and her Muslim identity.

Biography 
Born in Karachi, Pakistan, in 1973, Tazeen Qayyum studied miniature painting at the National College of Art in Lahore, Pakistan, graduating in 1996 with a BFA.

As a response to the 9/11 attacks, Qayyum began using the cockroach as a metaphor to connote the loss of life in the subsequent wars connected to the attacks, as well as fear and misunderstanding of other cultures. While the cockroach first appeared as part of her miniature painting practice, it would evolve into sculpture and installation work including A Holding Pattern, a multi-media piece that was installed at Toronto's Pearson International Airport in 2013.

Qayyum's more recent circular text pieces are performative based and originate from her work with installations of the repeated forms of cockroaches. Recurring singular phrases written in the Urdu (the artist's mother tongue) are drawn from the centre of the paper or canvas, concentrically moving out. These performances have been as long as twenty-four hours in duration. These drawing performances often result in joint pain.

Along with her artistic practice, Qayyum has offered workshops in miniature painting. She co-founded Offset Portfolio Centre in 1997, a gallery and resource centre for artists in Pakistan.

Selected solo exhibitions 
Qayyum's work has been shown internationally in solo exhibitions including Miniature Paintings, Gallery Jutner, AIR Program, Vienna, Austria (2000), The Human Dichotomy, Aicon Contemporary (2008), A Holding Pattern at Toronto's Pearson International Airport (2013), (IN) Surge (NT) at the Canvas Gallery, Karachi (2015), Tazeen Qayyum: Descent at Canvas Gallery, Karachi (2018), and Sakoon at Zalucky Contemporary, Totonto (2022).

Selected group exhibitions 
Qayyum's work has been shown in numerous group exhibitions. These include:  Elusive Realities: recent works by Tazeen Qayyum and Sumaira Tazeen, Chawkandi Gallery, Karachi, Pakistan (2008) Art in Review: Farida Batool, Adeela Suleman and Tazeen Qayyum, Aicon Gallery (2009), Veiled: Andrew McPhail, Grace Ndiritu, Tazeen Qayyum, Textile Museum, Toronto (2012), and Beyond Measure: Domesticating Distance, The Robert McLaughlin Gallery, Oshawa, 2015 among others.

Performances 
Qayyum's drawing based performances include Unvoiced held at the 1st Karachi Biennale, Pakistan in 2017,  and 'We do not know who we are where we go’, which was part of the Mixer Project at The Royal Conservatory of Music, Toronto (2016). She has also directed performance work including Double Date in 2007 produced by SAVAC (South Asian Visual Arts Collective) at Lennox Contemporary Gallery, Toronto and AKA Gallery, Saskatoon, and A Feast in Exile held in 2009 and produced by VASL Artist's Collective.

Personal life 
Tazeen Qayyum is married to digital media artist Faisal Anwar and lives in Oakville, Ontario.

Bibliography 
Mitra, Srimoyee (2015). Border Cultures. Art Gallery of Windsor and Black Dog Publishing (Windsor, ON; London, UK). 

Siddiqui, Ambereen (2015). Beyond Measure: Domesticating Distance. The Robert McLaughlin Gallery, (Oshawa, ON). 

Akhter, Asim (2009). ‘Artificial Paradise,’ Discretion is Advised. Gandhara-art, (Karachi, Pakistan).

Sivanesan, Haema (2008). 'Stories for the Moment.' Urban Myths & Modern Fables. Doris McCarthy Gallery (Toronto, ON), SAVAC (Toronto, ON). 

Hashmi, Salima  and Dalmia, Yashodhara (2007). Memory, Metaphor, Mutations, Contemporary Art of India and Pakistan. Oxford University Press (New Delhi, India). 

Hashmi, Salima (2006). ‘Spinning Stories, The Art of Pakistani Women Miniaturists,'  A Thousand and One Days: Pakistani Women Artists. Honolulu Academy Of Art (Honolulu, Hawaii). 

Malik, Murtaza (2003). Unveiling the Visible: Lives and Works of Women Artists of Pakistan. Actionaid (Pakistan).

References 

1973 births
Living people
21st-century women artists
Artists from Karachi
National College of Arts alumni